Whittemore House may refer to:

 Whittemore House (Arlington, Massachusetts), listed on the National Register of Historic Places (NRHP)
 Whittemore House (Gloucester, Massachusetts), listed on the NRHP
 Whittemore House (Washington, D.C.), listed on the NRHP